Janine Mellor (born 3 May 1980, in Huddersfield) is an English actress. She is best known for playing Kelsey Phillips in BBC One's BAFTA-winning drama Casualty from 2005 to 2009.

Biography 
Mellor attended at Lepton County Primary School, King James's School at Almondbury and Greenhead College. She danced with the Kirkheaton-based Clare Doosey School of Dance. She studied at Queen Margaret University College, Edinburgh and graduated from there with an honours degree in acting. Her TV credits include South Riding and Fat Friends. From 2005 to 2009 she played the nurse Kelsey Phillips in Casualty. In 2013 she played a main role in the theatre play Marriage at the Belgrade Theatre together with Mark Fleischmann. Her other theatre credits include The Seagull, Dancing at Lughnasa, and Into the Woods.

Filmography 
 2005: Fat Friends (TV Series, 5 episodes)
 2005: Casualty @ Holby City (TV Series, 2 episodes)
 2005: Holby City (TV Series, 1 episode)
 2005-2009: Casualty (TV Series, 169 episodes)
 2011: South Riding (TV Series, 2 episodes)
 2011: Coronation Street (TV Series, 1 episode)
 2018: Doctor Who (TV Series, Episode “The Woman Who Fell to Earth”)
 2019: Doctors (TV Series, 9 episodes)

External links

References 

1980 births
Alumni of Queen Margaret University
English television actresses
Living people
Actresses from Huddersfield